Studio Alex was a Japanese video game development firm. It was founded by respected programmer Kazunari Tomi, a former employee of Nihon Falcom whose credits include Sorcerian, Star Trader, and Dinosaur. After leaving Nihon Falcom, he founded Studio Alex, which functioned primarily as a consultant company.

Studio Alex developed the initial three titles of the Lunar series, with Game Arts as co-developer and publisher. In 2003, the company filed a lawsuit against Game Arts over secondary creator copyrights to Lunar: The Silver Star, but were sued in turn for damages in regard to trouble over the Magic School Lunar theatrical animation, and lost. Studio Alex bankrupted thereafter.

Major works
 Sega CD
Lunar: The Silver Star
Lunar: Eternal Blue

 Game Gear
Lunar: Walking School

 TurboGrafx-16
Gotzendiener (published by Gainax)

 Windows
Rema the Truth (co-developed with Ehrgeiz, published by KSS)

References

Lunar (series)
Defunct video game companies of Japan